George E. Paterno (September 7, 1928 – June 23, 2002) was an American football player and coach and radio broadcaster. He served as the head football coach at the United States Merchant Marine Academy in King's Point, New York from 1965 to 1968 and again from 1971 to 1975, comping a record of 46–32–3.

After retiring from coaching, he served as a play-by-play radio analysts for Penn State Nittany Lions football broadcasts. He was the brother of Penn State head coach Joe Paterno.

References

1928 births
2002 deaths
American football fullbacks
Brown Bears football players
Penn State Nittany Lions football announcers
Merchant Marine Mariners football coaches
Michigan State Spartans football coaches
High school football coaches in New York (state)
Sportspeople from Brooklyn
Players of American football from New York City